Cédric Bakambu (born 11 April 1991) is a professional footballer who plays as a forward for Super League Greece club Olympiacos.

He made his professional debut for Sochaux in 2010, and played 107 official games for them over five seasons, scoring 21 goals. He then moved to Bursaspor for €1.8 million, finishing as top scorer as his team came runners-up in the Turkish Cup, before signing for Villarreal a year later.

Born in France, he represented them internationally at youth level up to the under-20s, scoring eight goals in 38 games and winning the 2010 UEFA European Championship for the under-19s. In 2015, he made his senior debut for the DR Congo national team.

Club career

Sochaux
Born in Vitry-sur-Seine, Val-de-Marne, Bakambu began his career at local Ivry at the age of 10 before transferring to Sochaux four years later.

On 1 May 2010, Bakambu played in the 2010 Coupe Gambardella Final and scored a goal for his team at the Stade de France. Sochaux, however, lost the match 4–3 on penalties. He had previously scored a double in the team's 4–3 aggregate semi-final victory over Metz.

Bakambu made his professional debut on 7 August 2010 in Sochaux's opening match of the Ligue 1 season against Arles-Avignon, appearing as an 83rd-minute substitute for Modibo Maïga in a 2–1 win at the Stade Auguste Bonal. The following month, he signed his first professional contract agreeing to a three-year deal with the club until June 2013.

On 17 September 2011, Bakambu scored his first professional goal, the first equaliser in a 2–2 draw at Lille OSC, eleven minutes after replacing Carlāo. A year and nine days later, as a 66th-minute replacement for King Osanga, he scored twice in a 3–2 extra-time home win over Evian in the third round of the Coupe de la Ligue.

Bakambu scored seven goals in 31 appearances over the 2013–14 Ligue 1 season, in which Sochaux were relegated; this included two on 21 December in a 2–1 home win over Rennes. Across the campaign, he was placed on the right wing by manager Hervé Renard until he would become sufficiently mentally mature for a centre-forward role. On 23 March, he was sent off for handball in a 2–1 loss at Saint-Étienne.

Bursaspor
On 1 September 2014, Bakambu left France for the first time, moving on a four-year transfer to Turkey's Bursaspor for a fee of €1.8 million and an annual salary of €800,000. He made his debut in the Süper Lig twelve days later, replacing Ozan İpek in the 55th minute of a 2–1 win at Gençlerbirliği. His first goals for the "Green Crocodiles" came on 19 October, in either half of a 2–2 draw against Eskişehirspor at the Bursa Atatürk Stadium, and six days later he scored a first professional hat-trick in a 5–0 win at Balıkesirspor. He finished his only league season in Bursa with 13 goals in 27 games.

In the season's domestic cup, Bakambu was the top scorer with eight goals in 12 games as his team reached the final before a 3–2 home loss to Galatasaray. This tally included trebles in a 5–0 win at Mersin İdmanyurdu on 27 January and a 3–0 victory over Fatih Karagümrük nine days later, both in the group stage. As Galatasaray won the double, Bursaspor faced them in the 2015 Turkish Super Cup on 8 August, with Bakambu playing the whole of the 1–0 loss.

Villarreal

On 19 August 2015, Spanish side Villarreal announced the signing of Bakambu on a five-year contract. He made his La Liga debut four days later, replacing Léo Baptistão in the 61st minute of a 1–1 draw at Real Betis in the first game of the season; on the 28th he came on for the same player and scored two goals in the closing minutes of the fixture against Espanyol at Estadio El Madrigal, to secure a 3–1 victory for the "Yellow Submarine".

Bakambu played his first game in European competition on 17 September, again as a substitute in a 2–1 loss at Rapid Wien in the group stage of the season's UEFA Europa League. On 22 October, he scored his first goals in the tournament, a first-half double in a 4–0 home win over Dinamo Minsk; he added another two the following 10 March against Bayer Leverkusen in the first leg of the last 16 (2–0 win, same aggregate). In the quarter-finals, he scored twice in each leg of a 6–3 aggregate win over Sparta Prague. He was one of four strikers named in the competition's Squad of the Season, and his 9 goals put him only one behind the top scorer, Athletic Bilbao's Aritz Aduriz.

On 1 October 2017, Bakambu scored a hat-trick in a 3–0 home win over Eibar. He then scored two goals in a 2–1 win at Girona and another in a 4–0 win over Las Palmas to be named La Liga Player of the Month, the first African to win the award.

In early January 2018, Villarreal manager Javier Calleja said that Bakambu was going through a transfer to Beijing Sinobo Guoan of the Chinese Super League. On 17 January 2018, Bakambu rescinded his contract with Villarreal. Two weeks later, however, Beijing Guoan still had not announced the signing of Bakambu who had already played and scored for the club. It was reported that Beijing Guoan were trying to avoid paying a 100 percent tax placed on incoming transfers worth over 45 million yuan (US$7 million) by the Chinese Football Association. The transfer went through in time for the start of the Chinese season with the full fees being paid.

Beijing Guoan
On 28 February 2018, the final day of the Chinese transfer window, Bakambu's protracted transfer from Villarreal to Beijing Sinobo Guoan was finally confirmed with the club paid his €40million release clause, but Beijing did not announce the Congolese forward's signing amid confusion over whether they had to pay a 100 per cent levy on the transfer.

He scored his first goal in China in his second game, in a 2–1 win over Jiangsu Suning. He won the Chinese FA Cup in his first season.

Marseille 
On 13 January 2022, Bakambu signed for French club Marseille on a contract until 30 June 2024. He scored in his first appearance for the club, after coming on as a substitute in a 2-0 win over Lens.

Olympiacos
On 16 September 2022, Bakambu signed for Greek club Olympiacos on a contract until 30 June 2025.

International career 
Bakambu was a French youth international and has represented the country at both under-18 and under-19 level. He was a part of the team that won the 2010 UEFA European Under-19 Championship on home soil. On 18 July, he scored twice in a 4–1 opening win over the Netherlands in Caen, and the 2–1 winner against Croatia in the semi-finals nine days later, also at the Stade Michel d'Ornano. He was also part of the team that came fourth at the 2011 FIFA U-20 World Cup in Colombia, opening a 2–0 win over Mali in the last group game in Cali.

In March 2015, he opted to represent DR Congo at senior level. On arrival in Kinshasa he was greeted by fans with banners of him, later reflecting "I hadn't even played a match yet they made banners for me. It's really something else. It was through football that I discovered my country."

He was first called up in June ahead of a friendly against Cameroon on the 9th, and started that match, a 1–1 draw at the Stade Charles Tondreau in Mons, Belgium.

On 26 March the following year, Bakambu scored his first international goal, opening a 2–1 win over Angola at the Stade des Martyrs with a penalty, in qualification for the 2017 Africa Cup of Nations. He added two more on 5 June, in a 6–1 win away to Madagascar. He was chosen in Florent Ibengé's squad for the final tournament in Gabon, and started in the opening group match, a 1–0 win over Morocco at the Stade d'Oyem. He then did not play again until a seven-minute run in the quarter-finals where the Congolese lost 2–1 to Ghana.

On 24 March 2019, Bakambu returned to action for DR Congo after missing previous qualifiers vs. rivals Congo to injury. He started and scored the winner in a 1–0 victory against Liberia. This secured The Leopards' qualification to the 2019 Africa Cup of Nations, at the expense of their opponents.

On 1 April 2022, following DR Congo's elimination from 2022 FIFA World Cup qualification at the hands of Morocco, Bakambu announced his retirement from the national team.

Personal life
Born in France to parents from the DR Congo, Bakambu said "I grew up with both cultures and I am very proud of that. I think it's something that enriches you."

Bakambu and international teammate Dieumerci Mbokani were at Brussels Airport when it was struck by terror attacks in March 2016; both escaped unharmed.

Career statistics

Club

International
Source:

Scores and results list DR Congo's goal tally first.

Honours
Bursaspor
Turkish Cup runner-up: 2014–15 
Beijing Guoan
Chinese FA Cup: 2018
International

France U19
UEFA European Under-19 Championship: 2010

Individual
UEFA European Under-19 Championship Team of the Tournament: 2010
Turkish Cup Top goalscorer: 2014–15
Facebook FA La Liga Best Breakthrough: 2016
Villarreal's Rookie of the Year: 2015–16
UEFA Europa League Squad of the Season: 2015–16
La Liga Player of the Month: October 2017
Chinese Super League Top goalscorer: 2020
Super League Greece Player of the Month: January 2023

Records
Top goalscorer in the history of Beijing Guoan

References

External links

 Cédric Bakambu club profile
 
 
 
 
 
 

1991 births
Living people
People from Vitry-sur-Seine
Footballers from Val-de-Marne
Citizens of the Democratic Republic of the Congo through descent
Democratic Republic of the Congo footballers
Democratic Republic of the Congo international footballers
French footballers
France youth international footballers
Association football forwards
FC Sochaux-Montbéliard players
Bursaspor footballers
Villarreal CF players
Beijing Guoan F.C. players
Olympique de Marseille players
Olympiacos F.C. players
Ligue 1 players
Championnat National 2 players
Süper Lig players
La Liga players
Chinese Super League players
Super League Greece players
2017 Africa Cup of Nations players
2019 Africa Cup of Nations players
French expatriate footballers
Democratic Republic of the Congo expatriate footballers
Expatriate footballers in China
Expatriate footballers in Spain
Expatriate footballers in Turkey
Expatriate footballers in Greece
Democratic Republic of the Congo expatriate sportspeople in China
Democratic Republic of the Congo expatriate sportspeople in Spain
Democratic Republic of the Congo expatriate sportspeople in Turkey
Democratic Republic of the Congo expatriate sportspeople in Greece
French expatriate sportspeople in China
French expatriate sportspeople in Spain
French expatriate sportspeople in Turkey
French expatriate sportspeople in Greece
French sportspeople of Democratic Republic of the Congo descent
2016 Brussels bombings
Black French sportspeople